The 2006 AFC Champions League was the 25th edition of the top-level Asian club football tournament and the 4th edition under the current AFC Champions League title. Al-Ittihad qualified automatically to the quarter-finals as Cup holders.

Jeonbuk Hyundai Motors won their first AFC Champions League title after beating Al-Karamah 3–2 on aggregate in the final. Jeonbuk also became the first team in history of Asia to have won the Champions League before the national league title (they won their first K League championship three years later, in 2009).

Format
Group Stage
A total of 28 clubs were divided into 7 groups of four* based on region i.e. East Asian and Southeast Asian clubs were drawn in groups E to G, while the rest were grouped in groups A to D.  Each club played double round-robin (home and away) against fellow three group members, a total of 6 matches each.  Clubs received 3pts for a win, 1pt for a tie, 0pts for a loss.  The clubs were ranked according to points and tie breakers were in the following order:
 Points earned between the clubs in question
 Goal Differential between the clubs in question
 Goals For between the clubs in question
 Points earned within the group
 Goal Differential within the group
 Goals For within the group

The seven group winners along with the defending champion advanced to the quarter-finals.

*Since two clubs from group F and two clubs from group G were disqualified, the remaining clubs in group F and G played against each other home and away.

Knockout Round
All 8 clubs were randomly matched; however, the only restriction was that the clubs from the same country could not face each other in the quarter-finals.  The games were conducted in 2 legs, home and away, and the aggregate score decided the match winner.  If the aggregate score couldn't produce a winner, "away goals rule" was used.  If still tied, clubs played extra time, where "away goals rule" still applied.  If still tied, the game went to penalties.

Group stage

Group A

Group B

Group C

Group D

Group E

Group F

Group G

Knock-out stage

Bracket

Quarter-finals

First leg

Second leg

Jeonbuk Hyundai Motors won 4–3 on aggregate.

Al Qadisiya won 5–2 on aggregate.

Ulsan Hyundai Horang-i won 7–0 on aggregate.

Al-Karamah won 4–2 on aggregate.

Semi-finals

First leg

Second leg

Jeonbuk Hyundai Motors won 6–4 on aggregate.

Al-Karamah won 1–0 on aggregate.

Final

First leg

Second leg

Jeonbuk Hyundai Motors won 3–2 on aggregate.

Top scorers

See also
2006 FIFA Club World Cup

References

External links
AFC Champions League 2006 Official Page (English)

 
2006
1